St Saviour's Priory is a ruined Augustinian monastery in Glendalough, County Wicklow, Ireland.

History 
The priory was likely founded  1162, which is when Lorcán Ua Tuathail, the founder, was made Archbishop of Dublin. Diarmait Mac Murchadha, the King of Leinster, was likely involved in the monastery's foundation. St Saviour's is roughly contemporary with Ferns Abbey, Baltinglass Abbey, and likely also Killeshin Church. It is located on a narrow floodplain to the south-east of the core of the Glendalough monastic site. The priory's relative isolation from the rest of the campus is thought to be a result of resentment towards the Augustinians by the long-established monastic community who occupied the site.

Architecture 

St Saviour's is built in the Irish Romanesque style. The priory church is lavishly decorated.

References

Notes

Sources 

Monasteries in Ireland